This is a list of railway stations in Chile that are part of transport in Chile. The list consists of stations in operation, proposed ones and those which have been closed.

Stations

Existing

1000mm gauge 
 Antofagasta port

1676mm gauge

Proposed 
 2010 proposed high-speed line linking port city Valparaiso to capital Santiago.

Further new infrastructure projects are on hold in:
 Viña del Mar
 Quilpue
 Villa Alemana
 Limache
 Quintero
 Olmue
 Til-Til
 Lampa
 Quilicura
 Quinta Normal
 Ventanas (through an extension)

Closed

External links 
 UN Map (via wayback machine)

 
Railway stations
Railway stations